Campo SC Freamunde is a multi-use stadium in Freamunde, Portugal.  It is currently used mostly for football matches and is the home stadium of S.C. Freamunde. The stadium is able to hold 4,000 people.

External links

 Frank Jasperneite page

Football venues in Portugal
S.C. Freamunde
Sports venues in Porto District